Vakin Loabin is a 2018 Maldivian family drama film directed by Ali Shifau. Co-produced by Mohamed Ali and Aishath Fuad Thaufeeq under Dark Rain Entertainment, the film stars Mohamed Jumayyil and Mariyam Majudha and Nuzuhath Shuaib in pivotal roles. The film was released on 5 March 2018. The film tells a story of a young couple’s divorce and its impact on everyone around.

Cast 
 Mohamed Jumayyil as Azaan Adam
 Mariyam Majudha as Nuha Zahir
 Nuzuhath Shuaib as Roona
 Khadheeja Ibrahim Didi as Salma
 Abdullah Shafiu Ibrahim as Whiskey
 Ahmed Sunie as Bullet
 Ibrahim Amaan as Isse
 Maisha Ahmed as Fazu
 Roanu Hassan Manik as Judge
 Ahmed Shakir as Uz. Ibrahim Adheel
 Mariyam Shakeela as Khalidha
 Azim as Samadh
 Ali Farooq as Office Boss
 Mariyam Sajiyath as Dr. Aisha
 Adam Rizwee as Hussain
 Maria Teresa Pagano as Tourist
 Mohamed Azim Abdul Haadi as Samad

Production
Filming commenced on 7 August 2017 and finished on in November 2017. It marks Jumayyil's second collaboration with Shuaib and his third collaboration with Majudha.

Soundtrack

Release and reception 
Vakin Loabin was released on 5 March 2018 and opened to a positive response at the box office. The film received a positive response from critics. 
Ismail Naail Nasheed from Rajje.mv applauded character development and the "remarkable" use of character building elements while specifically praising the screenplay for toning down its melodrama and breaking from the stereotypes of its genre.

Accolades

Sequel
In March 2018, Mohamed Ali announced that he intended to develop a sequel of Vakin Loabin, reprising the characters from the original. The sequel is expected to release in 2020.

References

2018 films
Dark Rain Entertainment films
Maldivian drama films
Films directed by Ali Shifau
2018 drama films
Dhivehi-language films